Philosepedon humeralis is a species of moth fly in the family Psychodidae

Distribution
Europe.

References 

Psychodidae
Diptera of Europe
Insects described in 1818
Taxa named by Johann Wilhelm Meigen